Thomas Lamson Ludington (born December 28, 1953) is a United States district judge of the United States District Court for the Eastern District of Michigan. Although the Eastern District of Michigan's other 14 judges cover the Southern Division, Ludington is the only judge for the entire Northern Division, which covers nearly a quarter of Michigan's land mass.

Education and career

Born in Midland, Michigan, Ludington received a Bachelor of Arts degree from Albion College in 1976 and a Juris Doctor from the University of San Diego School of Law in 1979. During the summers of 1976 and 1977, he directed the water-ski school for Culver Academies in Culver, Indiana. He was in private practice in Michigan from 1980 to 1994. He was a judge on the 42nd Circuit Court of Michigan from 1994 to 2006, serving as Chief Judge of that court from 1999 to 2006.

Federal judicial service
Ludington was originally nominated through President George W. Bush on September 12, 2002, to a federal judgeship in the United States District Court for the Eastern District of Michigan vacated by Paul V. Gadola. During this time the judicial nomination process was blocked by Democrats in the United States Senate, and Ludington's appointment was delayed for 1,365 days. Ludington was later confirmed unanimously on June 8, 2006, and received his commission on June 12, 2006.

Notable opinions 
In Al-Sadoon v. Lynch, 586 F. Supp. 3d 713 (E.D. Mich. 2022), Ludington granted habeas relief—for the first time in his nearly 30-year tenure as a judge—to Ali Najim Al-Sadoon, whom the Biden Administration forgot about as a result of its February 18, 2021 reprioritization of removable immigration detainees. Ludington found that the Biden Administration had detained Al-Sadoon "not charged with any crime, for 757 days—more than 17% of his life," which was "longer than any other [habeas] petitioner—ever."

References

Sources

1953 births
Living people
Michigan state court judges
Judges of the United States District Court for the Eastern District of Michigan
United States district court judges appointed by George W. Bush
21st-century American judges
People from Midland, Michigan
Albion College alumni
University of San Diego School of Law alumni